DZCE-TV (channel 48) is a television station in Metro Manila, Philippines, serving as the flagship of the INCTV network. Owned and operated by Christian Era Broadcasting Service International, a broadcast ministry of the Iglesia ni Cristo (an independent Philippine Christian church), the station maintains studio and transmitter facilities located at Milton Hills Subdivision, Redeemer St., Brgy. New Era, Quezon City.

History 
The channel was first launched in 2000 as a cable-only television station under the longer name Iglesia ni Cristo Television, carrying the Church's long line of evangelical television programs that had begun in mid-1983 on the People's Television Network and Radio Philippines Network and later on other TV networks in the country. The arrival of Net 25 in 1999, joined by the launch of the cable station, unified all the shows into two stations, one on cable and one on FTA television. In mid-2005, the cable station was relaunched as GEM TV (Global Expansion Media Television), with a mix of religious and secular programs, which operated with a power of a minuscule 1 kilowatt.

On October 9, 2012, GEM TV Channel 49 on Free TV began test broadcasts. On  October 31, 2012, coinciding with the birthday of Iglesia ni Cristo's Executive Minister Eduardo Manalo, GEM TV on cable was soon relaunched once again as INC TV, this time expanding into free-to-air television with 17 hours of broadcasts (24 hours on cable), with an improved programming, and a brand new 30 kilowatt transmitter output. INC TV 49 shows religious programs of the Iglesia ni Cristo, before its relaunch Deutsche Welle programs were also aired on the channel. During its GEMTV days, it was the first broadcast television network in the Philippines to formally launch in high-definition and in Digital terrestrial television using the ISDB-T system in 2009.

TV Network

Philippines
It is broadcast on both Channel 48 on analog terrestrial TV, and on Channel 49 (or LCN 25.01) on digital terrestrial TV in Metro Manila. This station is also carried by major cable operators in the country led by SkyCable (in Mega Manila, INC TV carries on Channels 20 and 136), Cablelink, SatLite, G Sat and Cignal.

Worldwide
INCTV reaches TV audiences on the Eastern and Pacific coasts, United States, Alaska and Hawaii and the whole of Asia including Singapore, Japan, South Korea, Hong Kong, Macau (in Portuguese), Taiwan, China as well as Australia, New Zealand, the UK, Turkey, France, Spain, Italy, Greece, Germany, Monaco, Switzerland, Iceland, Denmark, Norway, Finland, Sweden and the entire continent of Europe.

Events

Recent Events
In time for the INC Centennial Year, new programs were created for the channel. The year 2014, also saw the start of the channel's new tradition - themes for the month, which are also promoted in Net 25 as well since recently.

From 2014, INC TV became the first Filipino religious TV network, and the third television network — following RPN and PTV — to broadcast its floatable digital clock during the course of the network's broadcast. The said move, however, finally abandoned in January 2018, as the network finally transitioned to full High Definition (HD) 16:9 screen ratio.

In 2015, two DZEM radio programs began to be shown on the channel as well.

In 2016, INCTV, the newest member of the Anak TV, bagged the most number of child-friendly television program awards (23 in all) in the Anak TV Seal Awards, the biggest for a young channel as this.

In 2018, the channel's news programming was revamped, and currently several of these are now bilingual to serve the needs of the church's local and international membership.

On April 16, 2020, INCTV was removed from DirecTV with the reason given that the channel had ceased operations.

On July 27, 2022, in conjunction with the celebration of Iglesia ni Cristo's 108th anniversary, INC TV unveiled its newest station ID, which features its newest logo and its slogan, "Changing Lives Through God's Words."

Programming

Digital television

Digital channels

DZCE broadcasts its digital signal on UHF Channel 49 (683.143 MHz) and is multiplexed into the following subchannels:

In addition, Christian Era Broadcasting Service International operates its channel on DZEC-TV UHF Channel 28 (557.143 MHz)

Analog-to-digital conversion 
From September 7, 2017, in time for its 8th year since INC's Executive Minister Eduardo Manalo entered office, INCTV was granted a "special authority" from the National Telecommunications Commission to move its analog feed from UHF Channel 49 to  Channel 48 (prior to this, the Channel 48 frequency was being used by People's Television Network, Inc. for their trial transmissions in digital TV until 2015) to allow the former channel to simulcast digitally in full-time, which began two days earlier (September 5). The shift was arranged for the station until its management announce its intention to permanently shut down analog broadcasts and go digital-only.

Areas of Coverage

Primary areas 
 Metro Manila 
 Cavite
 Laguna
 Bulacan
 Rizal

Secondary areas 
 Portion of Bataan
 Portion of Pampanga
 Portion of Nueva Ecija
 Portion of Tarlac
 Portion of Zambales
 Portion of Batangas
 Portion of Quezon

INC TV stations

INC TV on Free TV

See also 
Christian Era Broadcasting Service International
Eagle FM 95.5
Eagle Broadcasting Corporation
DZEC-TV
Net 25
DZEC Radyo Agila 1062
INC Radio DZEM 954 kHz
Iglesia ni Cristo

References

External links 
INC TV Official Website
Iglesia ni Cristo Official Website
INC Media Official Website

Iglesia ni Cristo
Television stations in Metro Manila
Television channels and stations established in 2005
Digital television stations in the Philippines
Religious television stations in the Philippines